Unthank is a village near Gamblesby in the civil parish of Glassonby in Cumbria, England. It is first mentioned in writing as Unthanke in 1332.

See also

Listed buildings in Glassonby

References

Villages in Cumbria
Glassonby